Joshua Eady is a Canadian producer, video editor, and director working in endurance sports, adventure, and race based television. 

Eady is best known for his role as the executive producer and director of Boundless, a documentary series produced for the Travel and Escape Network in Canada, and NBC’s Esquire Network in the United States. Eady has produced and directed for the Food Network, ESPN, Canwest, Alliance Films, CMT, Travel and Escape Network, and NBC’s Esquire Network.

Josh co-founded Eady Bros Productions, a broadcast production company specializing in interactive and television content. At Eady Bros, Josh directed and produced “Inside Dinning Out”, a one-hour special for Food Network and Discovery Asia, featuring Moriomoto the Iron Chef; executive produced and directed Boundless, an hour documentary series for T+E and NBC’s Esquire channel. As an editor Josh has worked on several television shows, including 3-time Gemini awardwinning Made to Order (Food Network, Fine Living), and 4-time Gemini Award-winning Departures (OLN, Discovery, National Geographic), where he received 3 back-to-back Gemini Award nominations for story editing in 2008, 2009, 2010.

Education
 University of Western Ontario, Fine Art Media/Visual Communications, BA (Hons) 1998-2002
 Vancouver Film School, Film Studies/Post Production and Film Editing, (Hons) 2002-2003
 Columbia Academy of Design, Television Studies, 2002-2003

Awards and honors
2008 Gemini Nominations for best editing in a documentary series
2009 Gemini Nomination for best editing in an information program or series
2010 Gemini Nomination for best editing in a documentary series
Design Licks Award
FWA Award
Perfect Vision Award
Marketing Magazine award
Canadian New Media Finalist

References

External links
 Canadian Screen Awards Nomination Canadian Film Review. Retrieved 2014-09-25
 Pair Continues to Push Boundaries of Human Endurance The London Free Press. Retrieved 2014-09-25
 Alumn's Adventures Know No Bounds Alumni Gazette. Retrieved 2014-09-25
Follow a pair of adventure junkies as they compete in races around the world. Mother Nature Network. Retrieved 2014-09-25
 Boundless Full Production Credits. New York Times. Retrieved 2014-09-25
 Joshua Eady Biography. New York Times. Retrieved 2014-09-25
 Official Website

Living people
Year of birth missing (living people)